Aras is a sub-district located in Yarim District, Ibb Governorate, Yemen. Aras had a population of 7755 as of  2004.

References 

Sub-districts in Yarim District